{{multiple image
| align = right
| image1 = Jujutsu kaisen.jpg
| width1 = 150
| alt1 = 
| caption1 = 
| image2 = JujutsuKaisenzeroOne.png
| width2 = 150
| alt2 = 
| caption2 = 
| footer = Cover of the first volume of Jujutu Kaisen (left) and the special  "Jujutsu Kaisen 0→1'''" alternative cover (right) for the Jujutsu Kaisen 0 volume, released to connect both stories.
}}Jujutsu Kaisen is a Japanese manga series written and illustrated by Gege Akutami. Akutami first published in 2017 a four-chapter series in Shueisha's Jump GIGA, titled Tokyo Metropolitan Curse Technical School, from April 28 to July 28, 2017. It was later published in a single volume, retroactively titled Jujutsu Kaisen 0, on December 4, 2018. Jujutsu Kaisen started in Shueisha's Weekly Shōnen Jump on March 5, 2018. Jujutsu Kaisen follows high school student Yuji Itadori as he joins a secret organization of Jujutsu Sorcerers in order to kill a powerful Curse named Ryomen Sukuna, of whom Yuji becomes the host. The series acts as a sequel to Jujutsu Kaisen 0, focused on the young Yuta Okkotsu who aims to control the curse of his childhood friend, Rika.

The chapters are collected and published by Shueisha into individual tankōbon volumes. The first volume was published on July 4, 2018. Twenty-two volumes have been released as of March 3, 2023. A nine-page one-shot chapter, following the daily lives of Yuta and the other first-year students, was included in a "Jujutsu Kaisen #0.5 Tokyo Prefectural Jujutsu High School" booklet, released in December 2021, to promote the film adaptation of Jujutsu Kaisen 0. During the month, Shueisha also released an alternative cover featuring Yuta and Yuji to connect it with the first volume of Jujutsu Kaisen.

Shueisha began to simulpublish the series in English on the app and website Manga Plus'' in January 2019. Viz Media published the first three chapters for its "Jump Start" initiative. In March 2019, Viz Media announced the print release of the series in North America. The first volume was published on December 3, 2019. As of December 20, 2022, eighteen volumes have been released.



Volume list

Chapters not yet in tankōbon format

References

Jujutsu Kaisen